The Walt Disney Company India Private Limited, known simply as Disney India, is the Indian subsidiary of the Indo Pacific region of the American media and entertainment conglomerate The Walt Disney Company and headquartered in Mumbai, Maharashtra.

In March 2019, after the acquisition of 21st Century Fox by Disney, which included Indian TV giant Star India, Disney India became India's biggest television broadcaster.

History

Joint venture
Walt Disney India was formed in August 1993 with a licensing agreement as a joint venture partnership between The Walt Disney Company and Modi Enterprises. Disney filed in October 2001 with the Foreign Investment Promotion Board to create a wholly owned subsidiary company to launch the Disney Channel in India. The Department of Industrial Policy and Promotion granted Disney an initial approval for the subsidiary but with Modi protesting because of similarities to their joint venture. When the 10 year licensing agreement ended, Modi and Disney could not come to a new agreement, thus ending the joint venture agreement in August 2003.

Walt Disney Television International (Asia Pacific) took over distribution of content in September 2003 via Star Movies, AXN and HBO plus 29 hours of children's programmes per week via DD Metro, Eenadu, SET, Star Plus and Star World.

Wholly owned subsidiary
The Walt Disney Company (India) Private Limited started operations in July 2004 based in Mumbai. On 17 December 2004, Walt Disney Television International India launched the Disney Channel and Toon Disney channel with five language feeds (English, Malayalam, Kannada, Telugu and Tamil languages). The channels were to be distributed by the Star Group. Disney India planned to focus initially on its channel operations before expanding in to other areas. In the long term, a Disney theme park in India is possible as land has been reportedly found on the outskirts of Delhi.  Also in December, with Indiagames as a partner, the Walt Disney Internet Group released Disney games, wallpapers and ringtones in the market which is also available on AirTel. In 2005, Disney Consumer Products (DCP) began working with various Indian retail outlets to establish Disney Corners within the outlets to sell licensed merchandise. In August, Funskool India and Disney entered in a contract for Funskool to sell Disney Princess products in India.

Disney India and Yash Raj Films agreed to co-produce and co-finance a yearly animated film for the India market in January 2007. Both companies would also work together on merchandising and games for the films.

In July 2006, Disney India acquired a controlling stake in Hungama TV from UTV Software Communications Limited while also taking a 14.9% share in UTV. In 2008, the company took an additional 17.5% share in UTV.

On 26 September 2006, the Disney Jeans brand was launched under license to Indus Clothing, which planned to open 30 Disney Jean stores by the end of 2007.  In October, DCP franchised to Ravi Jaipuria Corporation the rights for five years to set up 150 Disney Artist brand stores and wholesale under the Disney Artist brand Disney character branded greeting cards, stationery, arts, crafts and party products in India, Nepal, Sri Lanka, Bangladesh and Maldives.

Disney Publishing Worldwide, a division of Walt Disney India, announced a licensing agreement in April 2009 with local publisher Junior Diamond to publish Disney comic books, in both English and Hindi. Jetix/Toon Disney was switched over in India to Disney XD on 14 November.

In May 2011, Disney and UTV agreed to co-produce Disney branded family films with both handling creative function and UTV producing, marketing and distributing the films. Walt Disney Company (South East Asia) Pvt Ltd. in July 2011 offered to purchase the public shareholders' stakes with approval given by the Cabinet Committee on Economic Affairs for them to increase their ownership. In February 2012, Disney announced the completion of the acquisition of UTV with UTV Chief Executive Officer Ronnie Screwvala becoming Managing Director of TWDC India replacing Mahesh Samat, who joined the company in 2007 from Johnson & Johnson.

In October 2012, Disney launched Disney Junior India, an ad-free channel for preschool kids. Earlier it was a one and a half hour programming block on Disney Channel India. Disney India launched its Live Entertainment operations in 2015 with the production of a Beauty and the Beast musical to be shown from October to December in Mumbai and Delhi.

Disney India indicated in August 2016 that it was shutting down UTV Motion Pictures, its Hindi film production unit, and focusing only on distribution of its Hollywood films. Disney India managing director Siddharth Roy Kapur also indicated he would let his contract lapse on 1 January 2017. On 28 November 2016, Mahesh Samat was to return as managing director, four years after he left the company.

On 12 September 2017, Walt Disney International announced a restructuring of its business in Asia, and that Mahesh Samat is to lead the new Disney South Asia division, combining India, Singapore, Malaysia, Thailand, Indonesia, Philippines and Vietnam.

On 5 October 2017, The Walt Disney Company India officially announced the launch of Disney International HD on 29 October 2017. The channel was to be the exclusive home to live action Disney Channel original content. The channel will not have any animation content, and will be replacing Bindass Play.

Disney launched its second HD channel UTV HD on 21 October 2018, showing Bollywood and Hollywood films in Hindi. It premieres a new movie every Friday.

On 7 November 2017, Disney announced the promotion of Abhishek Maheshwari as country head for India. He was to report to Mahesh Samat, Walt Disney International South Asia managing director. On 14 December 2017, The Walt Disney Company announced the acquisition of 21st Century Fox, which includes Star India.

Consumers Products licensed DLF Brands for Disney & Me stores that opened in April 2018. The Live Entertainment divisions' second musical, Aladdin, premiered on 20 April 2018.

On 13 December 2018, Disney announced Uday Shankar, who serves as president of Fox Asia and chairman of the Star India, will lead Disney's Asian Pacific region and chairman of Disney India after the acquisition of 21st Century Fox, including Star India closes. On 1 April 2019, Uday Shankar, president Disney Asia Pacific, announced the restructuring of the complete entity of Star India and Disney, while Sanjay Gupta will lead the Indian businesses and head the Disney Studios India and Fox Star Studios in India, directly reporting to Uday Shankar who is also Chairman of Star and Disney India. Gupta resigned as country head in November 2019, while UTV channels were merged into the Star India bouquet.

Disney XD was replaced with Marvel HQ channel on 20 January 2019 at noon. Star India networks took over distribution of Disney channels in July 2019. Disney Channel, Hungama TV, Marvel HQ and Disney Junior became part of Disney Kids Pack while Bindass and Disney International HD became part of Star Value Pack. Later, in February 2020, Star Gold underwent a branding overhaul, while its sister channel Movies OK was replaced by Star Gold 2.

On 30 December 2020, Disney announced that the Star branding will be replaced with Utsav from 1 February in Netherlands.

On 26 January 2022, Tata Sky was rebranded into Tata Play.

Marvel HQ was replaced with Super Hungama channel on 1 March 2022.

On 14 April 2022, The Walt Disney Company India rebranded Star India to Disney Star. 

On 27 May 2022, Fox Star Studios was renamed Star Studios, as part of the removal of the "Fox" name from the studios that had been acquired from 21st Century Fox by Disney.

Following a long-awaited restructuring paradigm, Disney announced plans to shut down the UTV brand, with UTV Movies, UTV HD and UTV Action being replaced respectively by Star Gold Romance, the HD feed of Star Gold 2 and Star Gold Thrills.

Units

Current Units

 Disney Consumer Products and Interactive Media
 Disney Consumer Products
 Disney Publishing Worldwide
 Disney Interactive
 Disney Star
 Star Media Networks
 Star Sports
 Star Media Networks South
 Disney Star Asianet
 Star Maa Network
 Star Studios
 Novi Digital Entertainment
 Disney+ Hotstar
 Mashal Sports (74%)
 Pro Kabaddi League
 Indian Super League (35%)

Former Units
 Walt Disney Pictures India
 Disney India Media Networks
 UTV Software Communications
 UTV Indiagames
 UTV Motion Pictures

Walt Disney Pictures India

Home Entertainment
The following Indian films were released under the Walt Disney Studios Home Entertainment banner.

Disney Live Entertainment

 Musicals
 Beauty and the Beast (2015) The staff on the show include Vikranth Pawar (director), Lesle Lewis (music director), and Terence Lewis (choreography).
 Aladdin (2018) The musical is co-produced with Indian company BookMyShow.

On air channels

India

International

Upcoming channels

Dissolved channels

See also
 List of films released by UTV Motion Pictures
 List of Walt Disney Pictures films
 Star Studios

Notes

References

External links
 
Info at The Economic Times

Film production companies based in Mumbai
 
India
Indian animation studios
Indian subsidiaries of foreign companies
Indian companies established in 1993
1993 establishments in Maharashtra
Television broadcasting companies of India
Mass media companies of India
Television networks in India
Broadcasting